The Robstown Rebels were a minor league baseball team based in Robstown, Texas in 1949 and 1950. Preceded by the 1949 Robstown Cardinals, the Robstown teams played exclusively as members of the Rio Grande Valley League, playing partial seasons in both years. Robstown hosted home minor league games at the Sun Sport Ball Park.

History
Minor league baseball began in Robstown, Texas in 1949, after the Donna team relocated. The 1949 Donna Cardinals began the season as members of the six–team, Class D level Rio Grande Valley League. The Brownsville Charros, Corpus Christi Aces, Del Rio Cowboys, Laredo Apaches and McAllen Giants joined Donna in beginning league play on April 27, 1949.

On June 6, 1949, the Donna Cardinals moved to Robstown, Texas with a 13–25 record. Completing the 1949 season with a record of 36–78 as the Robstown Cardinals, the Donna/Robstown team finished last in the league standings with an overall record of 49–93,. The team placed 6th, playing the season under managers Russell Frisch, Charlie Engle and Mimi Cavazos. The Cardinals finished 43.0 games behind the 1st place Corpus Christi Aces in the final regular season standings. Donna/Robstown finished behind Corpus Christi (89–51), the Laredo Apaches (80–60), Brownsville Charros (75–65), McAllen Giants (70–68) and Del Rio Cowboys (58–80) in the standings.

Continuing play, Robstown hired Fabian Kowalik as manager in 1950, luring him out of retirement from operating a successful beer distributorship.

The 1950 Robstown "Rebels" continued Rio Grande Valley League play, as the Rio Grande Valley League expanded. The 1950 Rio Grande Valley League became a Class C level league, expanding to eight teams. The league added the Harlingen Capitals and the Donna-Weslaco Twins as the two new franchises, as Robstown continued play as the Robstown Rebels. On May 13, 1950, the Rebels had a record of 13–18 when the team folded, as Fabian Kowalik served as manager. The Rio Grande Valley League permanently folded following the 1950 season.

Robstown was without minor league baseball until the 2009 Coastal Bend Thunder began a two season tenure as members of the independent United League Baseball.

The ballpark
The 1949 and 1950 Robstown teams hosted minor league home games at the Sun Sport Ball Park. The ballpark expanded capacity from 800 in 1949 to 2,200 in 1950. Sun Sport Ball Park was located at 118 East Main Avenue.

Timeline

Year–by–year record

Notable alumni
Charlie Engle (1949, MGR)
Fabian Kowalik (1950, MGR)

References

External links
Baseball Reference 
Defunct baseball teams in Texas
Baseball teams established in 1950
Baseball teams disestablished in 1950
1950 establishments in Texas
1950 disestablishments in Texas
Defunct Rio Grande Valley League teams
Nueces County, Texas